This article encompasses events, births, and deaths from 2022 in Germany, as well as predicted and scheduled events which have yet to happen.

Germany's foreign policy and a significant extent of its domestic affairs have been directly or partially of a result of the Russian invasion of Ukraine. Under the leadership of Chancellor Olaf Scholz, whose first full calendar year in office was 2022, in conjunction with most of NATO's members and allies, Germany increased its defense budget and halted Nord Stream 2. The German government became a staunch supporter of Ukraine, with it only trailing Poland in receiving Ukrainian refugees between all allies of Ukraine; Germany also cut down on its imports of Russian energy and signed new LNG deals with both QatarEnergy and ConocoPhillips.

Domestically, Germany saw a population increase to 84 million, a record for the nation, mostly due to accepting a large number of refugees from Ukraine.

Incumbents
President: Frank-Walter Steinmeier 
Chancellor: Olaf Scholz
Bundestag: 20th
President of the Bundestag: Bärbel Bas
Largest party in Bundestag: Social Democratic Party (SPD)

Events 
 4 January  2021–22 Tour de Ski ends.
 6 January  2021–22 Four Hills Tournament ends.
 14–16 January  2022 European Short Track Speed Skating Championships
 24 January  Heidelberg University shooting
 24–30 January  2022 IBU Open European Championships
 26–30 January  2022 German Masters snooker tournament
 26 - Leader of the Alternative for Germany (AFD) Jörg Meuthen resigns from the AfD. He justified this with the fact that he had lost the power struggle with the formally dissolved right-wing extremist "Der Flügel" ("the wing") over the political direction of AfD. Meuthen criticized that the party had developed far to the right. 
 31 January  2022 Kusel shooting; two officers are shot and killed at a traffic stop.
 10–20 February  The 72nd Berlin International Film Festival is held; Carla Simón's film Alcarràs wins the top prize.
 13 February  The 2022 German presidential election: Frank-Walter Steinmeier is re-elected.
 17 February  The 58th Munich Security Conference is held.
 27 March  2022 Saarland state election: The SPD wins a landslide victory. 
 21 April – 1 May  2022 IIHF World U18 Championships
 25 April – Anke Rehlinger is elected Minister-President of Saarland by the Landtag.
 8 May  2022 Schleswig-Holstein state election; the CDU wins in a landslide while the SDP suffers a blowout loss and is reduced to the third largest party.
 15 May  2022 North Rhine-Westphalia state election; the CDU remains as the largest party while The Greens nearly triple their vote share and become the state's third largest party.
 3 June
 Garmisch-Partenkirchen train derailment
 3–5 June  2022 Judo Grand Slam Düsseldorf
 8 June  The 2022 Berlin car attack kills one and injures 17 others.
 18 June  Documenta fifteen starts.
 26-28 June  48th G7 summit
 11–21 August  2022 European Championships
 1 September: Poland's Jarosław Kaczyński, leader of the Law and Justice party, announced the Polish government's intent to officially demand that the German government pay 6.2 trillion zł in World War II reparations.
 9 October  2022 Lower Saxony state election. The SPD expanded its plurality in the state's Landtag by two seats.
 2 December – 2022 FIFA World Cup: the German mens' football national team, despite defeating Costa Rica 4-2, is knocked out of the World Cup due to Japan's upset win over Spain.
 7 December  2022 Germany coup d'état plot: German police arrest 25 members of the Reichsbürger movement accused of planning a coup d'état.
 16 December  The AquaDom aquarium in Berlin, Germany, home to 1,500 tropical fish of more than 100 different species, bursts, flooding local streets. The majority of the fish die during the incident, and two people are injured.
 17 December Dresden Green Vault burglary: German authorities recover 31 royal jewellery items that were stolen from the Green Vault museum at Dresden Castle in Dresden, Saxony, Germany, in 2019.

Deaths 

 1 January  Andreas Kunz, German Nordic combined athlete (born 1946)
 7 January  Eberhard Heinrich Zeidler, German-Canadian architect (born 1926)
 10 January  Ali Mitgutsch, German author of picture books and a professional advertising Illustrator (born 1935)
 19 January 
 Hans-Jürgen Dörner, German footballer (born 1951)
 Hardy Krüger, German actor (born 1928)
 20 January  Heidi Biebl, German alpine skier (born 1941)
 22 January   Hartmut Becker, German actor (born 1938)
 31 January  Ekkehardt Belle, German television actor (born 1954)
 3 February  Dieter Mann, German actor, director, university professor, and radio personality (born 1941)
 15 February  Peter Merseburger, German journalist and author (born 1928)
 10 March  Jürgen Grabowski, German football player (born 1944)
 16 March  Egidius Braun, German football administrator (born 1926)
 8 April  Uwe Bohm, German actor (born 1962)

 9 April   Michael Degen, German actor (1932)
 15 April  Bernhard Germeshausen, German bobsledder (1951)
 16 April  Joachim Streich, German football player (born 1951)
 25 April  Ursula Lehr, German politician, minister for youth, women, family and health (born 1930)
 26 April  Klaus Schulze, German electronic music pioneer, composer and musician (born 1941)
 15 May  Rainer Basedow, German actor (born 1938)
 28 May  Marion van de Kamp, German actress (born 1925)
 4 June  Frank Hoffmann, actor (born 1938)
 5 June  Jürgen Möllemann, German politician (born 1945)
 7 June  Carl, Duke of Württemberg, German royal, head of the House of Württemberg since 1975 (born 1936)
 11 June  Bernd Bransch, German footballer and Olympic champion (born 1944)
 11 June  Peter Reusse, actor (born 1941)
 17 June  Margot von Renesse, politician (SPD) (born 1940)
 23 June  Ernst Jacobi, actor (born 1933)
 25 June  Bernhard Wessel, football player (born 1936)

 28 June  Martin Bangemann, politician (FDP), (born 1934)
 28 June  Katja Husen, politician (born 1976)
 28 June  Peter von der Osten-Sacken, lutheran theologian (born 1940)
 29 June  Manfred Krafft, football player(born 1937)
 30 June  William Cohn, actor (born 1957)
 13 July  Dieter Wedel, film director (born 1939)

 14 July  Jürgen Heinsch, footballer (born 1940)
 19 July  Dieter Helm, politician (born 1941)
 21 July  Uwe Seeler, footballer (born 1936)
 29 July  Sybille Benning, politician (born 1961)
 29 July  Margot Eskens, singer (born 1936)
 31 July  Maria Frisé, journalist and author (born 1926)
 5 August  Peter Schowtka, politician (born 1945)
 7 August  Eike Christian Hirsch, journalist and author (born 1937)
 9 August  Heinz Behrens, actor (born 1932)

 12 August  Wolfgang Petersen, film director and film producer (born 1941)
 16 August  Eva-Maria Hagen, actress and singer (born 1934)
 17 August  Hellmut Flashar, philologist, translator and medicine historian (born 1929)
 18 August  Rolf Kühn, jazz clarinetist and saxophonist (born 1929)
 20 August  Franz Hummel, composer (born 1939)
 22 August  Theo Sommer, journalist (born 1930)
 29 August  Hans-Christian Ströbele, politician (born 1939)
 4 September  Heidemarie Fischer, politician (born 1944)
 7 September  Dagmar Schipanski, politician (born 1943)
 11 September  Roland Reber, actor, theatre director and producer (born 1954)

 15 September  Fritz Pleitgen, television journalist and author (born 1938)
 22 September  Rainer Keller, politician (born 1965)
 24 September  Manfred Degen, politician (born 1939)
 24 September  Helmut Wilhelm, judge and politician (born 1946)
 27 September  Prince Ferfried of Hohenzollern, member of the princely House of Hohenzollern-Sigmaringen and champion race car driver (born 1943)
 4 October  Günter Lamprecht, actor (born 1930)
 4 October  Jürgen Sundermann, football player and manager (born 1940)
 5 October   Barbara Stamm, politician (born 1944)
 5 October  Wolfgang Kohlhaase, film director (born 1931)
 14 October 
 Ralf Wolter, actor (born 1926)
 Georg Scholz, politician (born 1958)
 15 October – Horst Metz, politician (born 1945)
 17 October –
 Heinz-Jörg Eckhold, politician (born 1941)
 Michael Ponti, pianist (born 1937)
 Franz Vorrath, Roman Catholic prelate (born 1937)
20 October – Helmut Kuhlmann, politician (born 1940)
21 October – 
Wolfgang Jenssen, politician (born 1942)
Rainer Schaller, entrepreneur (born 1969)
23 October – 
Walter Gaudnek, artist (born 1931)
Benno Zech, politician (born 1928)
24 October – Dieter Werkmüller, lawyer (born 1937)
26 October – Sebastian von Rotenhan, politician (born 1949)
28 October – 
Wolfgang Bordel, theatre manager (born 1951)
Hannah Pick-Goslar, Holocaust survivor (born 1928)
29 October – 
Wolfgang Lange, Olympic canoeist (born 1938) 
Heinrich Schneier, politician (born 1925)
30 October – Rosemarie Köhn, clergywoman (born 1939)
2 November – Michael Möllenbeck, Olympic discus thrower (born 1969)
3 November –
Peter Danckert, politician (born 1940)
Gerd Dudek, saxophonist (born 1938)
6 November – Sig Ohlemann, Olympic runner (born 1938)
9 November –
Hans-Joachim Klein, political militant (born 1947)
Werner Schulz, politician (born 1950)
12 November – Klaus Peter Sauer, evolutionary biologist and ecologist (born 1941)
14 November – Werner Franke, biologist (born 1940)
18 November – Manfred Palmen, politician (born 1945)

24 November –
Chanoch Ehrentreu, German-born English rabbi (born 1932)
Hans Magnus Enzensberger, author, poet, translator and editor (born 1929)
26 November –Jens Bullerjahn, politician (born 1962)
27 November – Hans Zehetmair, politician (born 1936)
3 December – Dietmar Kuegler, publisher and author (born 1951)
3 December – Alfons Vogtel, politician (born 1952)
4 December – Manuel Göttsching, musician (born 1952)
5 December – Bernd Rohr, cyclist (born 1937)
7 December – Bernhard Brinkmann, politician (born 1952)
7 December – Jann-Peter Janssen, politician (born 1945)
8 December –  Aldona Gustas, author (born 1932)
9 December – Ruprecht Eser, journalist (born 1943)
11 December – Wolf Erlbruch, illustrator and writer of children books (born 1948)
12 December – Hermann Nuber, footballer (born 1935)
12 December – Wolfgang Ziffer, actor (born 1941)
14 December – Volker Eid, Roman-catholic theologian and author (born 1940)
14 December – Wulf Kirsten, writer, poet and novelist (born 1934)
14 December – Sybil Gräfin Schönfeldt, author and writer (born 1927)
16 December – Klaus Mayer, Roman-catholic priest and author (born 1923)
17 December – Werner Leich, lutheran bishop (born 1927)
17 December – Dieter Henrich, philosopher (born 1927)
17 December – Manfred Messerschmidt, historian (born 1926)
17 December – Marie-Luise Scherer, author and journalist (born 1938)
19 December – Erwin Josef Ender, prelate of Roman Catholic Church (born 1937)
19 December – Manfred Messerschmidt, historian (born 1926)
20 December – Barbara Noack, author (born 1924)
21 December –Hartmut Holzapfel, politician (born 1944)
26 December – Michael Fuchs, politician (born 1949)
26 December – Konrad Kruis, lawyer (born 1930)
29 December – Maximilian, Margrave of Baden, aristocrat (born 1933)
31 December – Benedict XVI, Pope (2005–2013) and archbishop of Munich and Freising (1977–1982).

References

 
Germany
Germany
2020s in Germany
Years of the 21st century in Germany